Mokolda was a town of ancient Anatolia, inhabited during Roman and Byzantine times. Its name does not occur among ancient authors, but is inferred from epigraphic and other evidence.

Its site is tentatively located near Moğlasın in Asiatic Turkey.

References

Former populated places in Turkey
Roman towns and cities in Turkey
Populated places of the Byzantine Empire
History of Denizli Province
Tavas District